In all French-speaking countries, Jean is a male name derived from the Old French Jehan (or Jahan). The female equivalent is Jeanne and derives from the Old French Jehanne. Both names derive from the Latin name Johannes, itself from the Koine Greek name Ioannes (Ιωαννης), the name used for various New Testament characters, most notably John the Baptist. The Greek name ultimately derives from the Biblical Hebrew name Yochanan (יוֹחָנָן), meaning "YHWH/Yahweh is Gracious".

People known only as Jean 
 Jean, Count of Harcourt (died 1473)
 Jean, Baron de Batz (1754–1822)
 Jean, duc Decazes (1864–1912)
 Jean, Grand Duke of Luxembourg (1921–2019), ruled Luxembourg, 1964–2000
 Prince Jean of Luxembourg (born 1957)
 DJ Jean (born 1968), Jan Engelaar, a Dutch disc jockey
 Jean (footballer, born 1972), Jean Paulo Fernandes, Brazilian goalkeeper
 Jean (footballer, born 1979), Jean Ferreira Narde, Brazilian defender
 Jean (footballer, born 1981), Jean Paulo Batista de França, Brazilian defender
 Jean (footballer, born 1982), Jean Carlos da Silva Ferreira, Brazilian striker
 Jean (footballer, born 1986), Jean Raphael Vanderlei Moreira, Brazilian defender and midfielder
 Jean (footballer, born 1992), Jean Acosta Soares, Brazilian midfielder
 Jean (footballer, born 1994), Jean Carlos de Souza Irmer, Brazilian midfielder
 Jean (footballer, born June 1995), Jean Carlos de Brito, Brazilian defender
 Jean (footballer, born October 1995), Jean Paulo Fernandes Filho, Brazilian goalkeeper

Jean as a male given name
 Jean Agélou (1878–1921), French photographer
 Jean Brankart (1930–2020), Belgian cyclist
 Jean Bricmont (born 1952), Belgian theoretical physicist and philosopher of science
 Jean Chrétien (born 1934), Canadian politician
 Jean Paul Getty (1892–1976), American-born British petrol-industrialist
 Jean Hersholt (1886–1956), Danish-American actor
 Jean Kahwaji (born 1953), Lebanese army general
 Jean Lopez (born 1973), American Taekwondo athlete and coach
 Jean Maciel (born 1989), Brazilian footballer
 Jean Mannheim (1863–1945), German-born American painter and educator
 Jean Njeim (1915–1971), Lebanese army general
 Jean Obeid (1939–2021), Lebanese politician
 Jean Orry (1652–1719), French economist
 Jean Piaget (1896–1980), Swiss psychologist and epistemologist
 Jean Reno (born 1948), French actor
 Jean Sibelius (1892–1952), Finnish composer
 Jean Todt (born 1946), president of the FIA

Fictional characters 
 Jean Pierre Polnareff, supporting character in Jojo’s Bizarre Adventure: Stardust Crusaders 
 Jean Havoc, supporting character in Fullmetal Alchemist
 Jean Kujo, A French karate expert from Virtua Fighter Series
 Jean Valjean, protagonist of the Victor Hugo novel Les Misérables
 Jean Roqua, trainer of Jake Tyler in the movie Never Back Down
 Jean Kirschtein, supporting character in Attack on Titan
 Jean Tannen, protagonist of the Gentleman Bastard Sequence

Songs about Jean 
Jean the Birdman by David Sylvian and Robert Fripp from the album The First Day

See also 
Articles beginning with Jean
Jean (female given name)
 Jean-André
 Jean-Antoine
 Jean-Baptiste
 Jean-Bernard
 Jean-Charles
 Jean-Christophe (given name)
 Jean-Claude (given name)
 Jean-Denis
 Jean-Étienne
 Jean-François
 Jean-Henri
 Jean-Jacques
 Jean-Louis
 Jean-Luc
 Jean-Marc
 Jean-Marie
 Jean-Martin
 Jean-Michel
 Jean-Pascal
 Jean-Paul (disambiguation)
 Jean-Philippe (given name)
 Jean-Pierre (given name)
 Jean-René
 Jean-Sébastien
 Jean-Yves

French masculine given names